Park Hyung-jun (also Park Hyeong-jin, ; born April 29, 1983 in Gyeongsangbuk-do) is a South Korean triple jumper. He represented South Korea at the 2004 Summer Olympics, and also spanned his best jump of 16.66 metres from the men's college national championships at Chungbuk Science High School in Jecheon.

Park qualified for the South Korean squad in the men's triple jump at the 2004 Summer Olympics in Athens. Four months before the Games, he set a career personal best and an Olympic B-standard jump of 16.66 metres at the college national championships in Jecheon to secure a berth on the South Korean athletics team. Park got off to a rugged start with a foul until he spanned a top qualifying jump of 15.84 on his second attempt, falling short of a personal best by 82 centimetres. Since his third jump spurred another foul, Park ended up in thirty-ninth against an immense roster of forty-eight athletes, and did not advance past the qualifying round.

References

External links

1983 births
Living people
South Korean male triple jumpers
Olympic athletes of South Korea
Athletes (track and field) at the 2004 Summer Olympics
Sportspeople from North Gyeongsang Province
21st-century South Korean people